The men's singles Squash event was part of the squash programme and took place between December 8 and December 12, at the Ambassador City Jomtien Hotel, Pattaya, Thailand.

Schedule
All times are Indochina Time (UTC+07:00)

Results

Finals

Top half

Section 1

Section 2

Bottom half

Section 3

Section 4

References 

Results

Men's singles